Japan Society may refer to:
Japan Society (Manhattan)
The Japan Society of the UK

See also